The 2003 Michigan State Spartans football team represented Michigan State University in the 2003 NCAA Division I-A football season. The Spartans play their home games at Spartan Stadium in East Lansing, Michigan. This was the first year for head coach John L. Smith, who would win Big Ten coach of the year in his debut, but would later be fired after the 2006 season.

The Spartans were coming off a 4–8 season and had just let go of head coach Bobby Williams.

Schedule

Roster

Coaching staff
John L. Smith – Head Coach
Jim McElwain – Assistant head coach/wide receivers coach/Special Teams coordinator
Dave Baldwin – Offensive coordinator/Tight end coach
Doug Nussmeier – Quarterbacks coach
Reggie Mitchell – Running backs coach/recruiting coordinator
Jeff Stoutland – Offensive line coach
Chris Smeland – Defensive coordinator/safeties coach
Steve Stripling – Defensive line coach
Mike Cox – Linebackers coach
Paul Haynes – Defensive backs coach
Robert Saleh – Graduate Assistant

2004 NFL Draft
The following players were selected in the 2004 NFL Draft.

References

Michigan State
Michigan State Spartans football seasons
Michigan State Spartans football